Southerly is an Australian literary magazine, established in the 1930s. It is published in hardcopy and online three times a year, and carries fiction and poetry by established and new authors as well as reviews and critical essays. The Long Paddock is an online supplement, carrying additional material.

History and profile
Southerly began in 1939 as a four-page bulletin of the Sydney branch of the London-based English Association, an organisation dedicated to preserving the purity of the English language. R. G. Howarth, lecturer in English at the University of Sydney, was the founding editor and continued as editor until he left Sydney in 1955. He published European and Australian literature together and wished to encourage 'cultural good relations between the mother and daughter countries'. The focus was on literature itself; the magazine was apolitical and non-ideological. Kenneth Slessor was editor from 1956 to 1961, and added the subtitle 'a review of Australian literature' and the academic discussion of local literature continued to develop as a focus. G.A. Wilkes was editor from 1962 to 1986, and  Elizabeth Webby from 1987. It is currently edited by David Brooks and Elizabeth McMahon.

A connection to the University of Sydney has been maintained over the years. The magazine is assisted by the Australia Council, the Australian Government’s arts advisory and support organisation, the New South Wales Ministry for the Arts and the School of English, Art, History, Film and Media, University of Sydney.

The title refers to a front of cold air coming from the south, bringing a quick cooling, and tempestuous conditions, after the heat of the day, referred to in Sydney as "Southerly busters".

Current staff 
(updated June 2019)

Editor — Elizabeth McMahon
Poetry editor — Kate Lilley
Fiction editor — Debra Adelaide
Nonfiction editor — Fiona Morrison
Reviews editor — Oliver Wakelin
Poetry reader — Holly Friedlander Liddicoat
Fiction reader and administrator — Jack Cameron Stanton

Notes

References
Carter, David, 'Magazine Culture: Notes Towards a History of Australian Periodical Publication 1920-1970', in Bartlett, Dixon & Lee (eds) 1999, Australian Literature and the Public Sphere, ASAL, Toowoomba, pp. 69–79. 
Green, H M 1962, A History of Australian Literature, Vol I 1789-1923, Angus & Robertson, Sydney. 
Greenop, Frank 1947, History of Magazine Publishing in Australia, K.G. Murray Publishing Company, Sydney. 
Tregenza, John 1964, Australian Little Magazines 1923-1954: Their Role in Forming and Reflecting Literary Trends, Libraries Board of South Australia, Adelaide.

External links
 Official website

1939 establishments in Australia
Literary magazines published in Australia
Magazines established in 1939
Magazines published in Sydney
Triannual magazines
University of Sydney